Hugo Lucien Mamba-Schlick (born 1 February 1982) is a retired Cameroonian triple jumper.

He finished sixth at the 2006 African Championships won the silver medal at the 2007 All-Africa Games and won the silver medal at the 2008 African Championships in Athletics. He also competed at the 2007, 2009 and 2011 World Championships without reaching the final. In 2010 he won the silver medal at the Commonwealth Games in Delhi, in a new personal best jump of 17.14 metres. This is the current Cameroonian record.

Competition record

External links

The professional home page of Hugo Mamba-Schlick

1982 births
Living people
Cameroonian male triple jumpers
Olympic athletes of Cameroon
Athletes (track and field) at the 2008 Summer Olympics
Athletes (track and field) at the 2010 Commonwealth Games
Commonwealth Games silver medallists for Cameroon
Commonwealth Games medallists in athletics
African Games bronze medalists for Cameroon
African Games medalists in athletics (track and field)
World Athletics Championships athletes for Cameroon
Athletes (track and field) at the 2007 All-Africa Games
Athletes (track and field) at the 2011 All-Africa Games
20th-century Cameroonian people
21st-century Cameroonian people
Medallists at the 2010 Commonwealth Games